Longquan Town is a town and the county seat in the central Xintian County, Hunan, China. Its seat is at Zhongshan Community.

References

Xintian County
County seats in Hunan